|}

The Sceptre Stakes is a Group 3 flat horse race in Great Britain open to fillies and mares aged three years or older. It is run at Doncaster over a distance of 7 furlongs and 6 yards (1,414 metres), and it is scheduled to take place each year in September.

History
The event is named after Sceptre, a successful filly foaled in 1899. Her victories included four Classics, concluding with Doncaster's St Leger Stakes.

The Sceptre Stakes used to be contested over 1 mile, and for a period it held Listed status. It was cut to 7 furlongs in 1993, and promoted to Group 3 level in 2011.

The race is now staged on the opening day of Doncaster's four-day St. Leger Festival.

Records
Most successful horse since 1986:
 no horse has won this race more than once since 1986

Leading jockey since 1986 (4 wins):
 Michael Hills – My Branch (1996), Mamounia (2002), Tantina (2003), Royal Confidence (2008)

Leading trainer since 1986 (5 wins):
 Barry Hills – Asteroid Field (1986), My Branch (1996), Mamounia (2002), Tantina (2003), Royal Confidence (2008)

Winners since 1986

See also
 Horse racing in Great Britain
 List of British flat horse races

References

 Paris-Turf: 
 Racing Post:
 galopp-sieger.de – Sceptre Stakes.
 horseracingintfed.com – International Federation of Horseracing Authorities – Sceptre Stakes (2018).
 pedigreequery.com – Sceptre Stakes – Doncaster.

Flat races in Great Britain
Doncaster Racecourse
Mile category horse races for fillies and mares